My Little Boy is a 1917 American silent drama directed by Elsie Jane Wilson based on the story by Rupert Julian with the scenario written by Elliott J. Clawson. The film stars Zoe Rae, Ella Hall and Emory Johnson. The film was released on December 17, 1917 by Universal Film Manufacturing Company under by the name Bluebird Photoplays.

Plot

Cast
Zoe Rae as Paul
Ella Hall as Clara
Emory Johnson as Fred
Winter Hall as Uncle Oliver
Harry Holden as Joe
Gretchen Lederer as Clara's Mother

Preservation
The film is now considered lost.

References

External links

1917 films
American silent feature films
American black-and-white films
Lost American films
Films directed by Elsie Jane Wilson
Universal Pictures films
1917 lost films
1910s American films